This is a list of all weapons ever used by the Italian Army. This list will go in chronological order so from earliest weapons to the present ones used by the Italian Army

World War II 

 List of Italian Army equipment in World War II

Cold War 

 List of Cold War weapons and land equipment of Italy

Present 

 List of equipment of the Italian Army

References

Military weapons of Italy
Weapons